Christiane Tretter (born 28 December 1964) is a German mathematician and mathematical physicist who works as a professor in the Mathematical Institute (MAI) of the University of Bern in Switzerland, and as managing director of the institute. Her research interests include differential operators and spectral theory.

Education and career
Tretter studied mathematics, with a minor in physics, at the University of Regensburg, earning a diploma in 1989, a Ph.D. in 1992, and a habilitation in 1998. Her doctoral dissertation, Asymptotische Randbedingungen für Entwicklungssätze bei Randeigenwertproblemen zu  mit -abhängigen Randbedingungen, was supervised by Reinhard Mennicken.

She became a lecturer at the University of Leicester in 2000, moved to the University of Bremen as a professor in 2002, and took her present position in Bern in 2006.

Since 2008 she has been editor-in-chief of the journal Integral Equations and Operator Theory.

Books
Tretter is the author of two mathematical monographs, Spectral Theory of Block Operator Matrices and Applications (2008) and On Lambda-Nonlinear-Boundary-Eigenvalue-Problems (1993), and of two textbooks in mathematical analysis.

Recognition
Tretter won the Richard von Mises Prize of the Gesellschaft für Angewandte Mathematik und Mechanik in 1995.

References

External links

1964 births
Living people
20th-century German mathematicians
German women mathematicians
German expatriates in England
German expatriates in Switzerland
University of Regensburg alumni
Academics of the University of Leicester
Academic staff of the University of Bremen
Academic staff of the University of Bern
21st-century German mathematicians
20th-century German women
21st-century German women